To Be Continued may refer to:

 To be continued, a plot device in fiction
 ...To Be Continued (Isaac Hayes album), 1970
 To Be Continued (Terje Rypdal album), 1981
 To Be Continued... (Temptations album), 1986
 To Be Continued... (Stefanie Sun album), 2003
 To Be Continued... (box set), a 1990 album box set by Elton John
 To Be Continued (TV series), a 2015 South Korean television series
 To Be Continued (film), a 2018 Latvian film

See also
 ...Continued, 1969 album by Tony Joe White